Sperm-associated antigen 8 is a protein that in humans is encoded by the SPAG8 gene.

The correlation of anti-sperm antibodies with cases of unexplained infertility implicates a role for these antibodies in blocking fertilization. Improved diagnosis and treatment of immunologic infertility, as well as identification of proteins for targeted contraception, are dependent on the identification and characterization of relevant sperm antigens. The protein encoded by this gene is recognized by sperm agglutinating antibodies from an infertile woman. This protein is localized in germ cells of the testis at all stages of spermatogenesis and is localized to the acrosomal region of mature spermatozoa. Alternatively spliced variants that encode different protein isoforms have been described but the full-length sequences of only two have been determined.

References

Further reading